Airports of Serbia is a Serbian state-owned company, which owns and operates five airports in Serbia. It has its head office at Niš Constantine the Great Airport in the city of Niš, Serbia.

This state-owned Public Enterprise was formed on 2nd of February 2016, by the Government of Serbia. The main tasks of the company is management, development and maintenance of the airport infrastructure in Serbia and region. Belgrade Nikola Tesla Airport is the only major airport in Serbia that is not operated by the Airports of Serbia. It is operated by French conglomerate Vinci Airports. The planned Trebinje Airport in Bosnia and Herzegovina will be the first airport outside of Serbia, owned and operated by the Airports of Serbia. The main goal is that all airports, except Belgrade Nikola Tesla Airport, become a part of the Airports of Serbia, for easier and more efficient management.

List of airports 

Airports of Serbia operates the following airports:

See also 
 List of airports in Serbia
 Transport in Serbia
 AirSerbia

References

External links 

Airports in Serbia
Government-owned companies of Serbia
Serbian companies established in 2016
2016 in transport
Transport companies established in 2016
Companies based in Niš
Airport operators
Niš
Bor, Serbia